Poissonnière is a station on Line 7 of the Paris Métro. It is located near the junction between rue La Fayette and rue du Faubourg Poissonnière, after which it is named and along which fishmongers (French: Poissonnières) brought fish from Boulogne-sur-Mer and other harbours on the Channel coast to the market at Les Halles in chasse-marées. The route from the coast generally followed that of a Roman Road and entered nineteenth century Paris at the Porte des Poissonniers.

History 
Poissonnière was opened on 5 November 1910 with the commissioning of the first section of line 7 between Opéra and Porte de la Villette. As part of the "Un métro + beau" programme by the RATP, the station was renovated and modernised on 9 December 2008.

On 9 October 2019, half of the nameplates on the station's platforms were temporarily replaced by the RATP to celebrate the 60th anniversary of the Asterix and Obelix comics, along with 11 other stations. Although its name was not changed, the new nameplates were stylised with typography reminiscent of the comic strips by René Goscinny and Albert Uderzo, the creators of the Asterix and Obelix comics. A character from the comics, Ordralfabétix, was also added to the nameplates.

In 2019, the station was used by 3,466,034 passengers, making it the 139th busiest of the Métro network out of 302 stations.

In 2020, the station was used by 1,686,977 passengers amidst the COVID-19 pandemic, making it the 149th busiest of the Métro network out of 305 stations.

Passenger services

Access 
The station has 3 entrances and features a 1960s-style yellow neon Métro sign.

 Entrance 1: rue La Fayette
 Entrance 2: rue de Chabrol
 Entrance 3: rue du Faubourg-Poissonnière

Station layout

Platforms 
Poissonnière has a standard configuration with 2 tracks surrounded by 2 side platforms.

Other connections 
The station is also served by lines 26, 32, 43, and 45 of the RATP bus network.

Nearby 

 Église Saint-Vincent-de-Paul
 Lycée Lamartine
 Square Aristide-Cavaillé-Coll
 Square Montholon

Gallery

References 

Paris Métro stations in the 9th arrondissement of Paris
Paris Métro stations in the 10th arrondissement of Paris
Railway stations in France opened in 1910